Whitfield is the name of two places in Florida:
 Whitfield, Manatee County, Florida, an unincorporated community and census-designated place
 Whitfield, Santa Rosa County, Florida, an unincorporated community and census-designated place